Telatyn  is a village in Tomaszów Lubelski County, Lublin Voivodeship, in eastern Poland. It is the seat of the gmina (administrative district) called Gmina Telatyn.

The village has a population of 603.

References

Villages in Tomaszów Lubelski County